Stevie Searle (born 7 March 1977) in Lambeth, London, England, is an English retired professional footballer who played as a midfielder for Barnet in the Football League.

References

1977 births
Living people
Footballers from Lambeth
English footballers
Association football midfielders
Barnet F.C. players
Stevenage F.C. players
Woking F.C. players
Welling United F.C. players
Fisher Athletic F.C. players
Tonbridge Angels F.C. players
Chatham Town F.C. players
English Football League players
Sittingbourne F.C. players